Barry Owens, is an Irish former Gaelic footballer who played for the Teemore Shamrocks club and the Fermanagh county team.

Playing career
Owens has been described as "among the best full-backs in Ireland".  He was an important part of Fermanagh's runs to the 2003 All-Ireland quarter-final and 2004 All-Ireland semi-final.  He is a double All-Star winner, having been honoured in 2004 and 2006.  Only two other Fermanagh footballers have received an All-Star award.

In January 2008, it was announced that Owens would undergo heart surgery, but he was expected to return to football within a few months.

On 21 June 2008, Fermanagh played Derry at Healy Park in the Ulster Senior Football Championship semi-final; it was then that Barry Owens made his comeback. Within minutes of coming onto the pitch as a substitute, he scored a vital goal to give Fermanagh a place in the Ulster final.

Honours
Teemore Shamrocks
 Fermanagh Senior Football Championship (1): 2005

St Michael's College
 MacRory Cup (1): 1999

Individual
 All Star Award (2): 2004, 2006

References

Year of birth missing (living people)
Living people
Fermanagh inter-county Gaelic footballers
Teemore Gaelic footballers